Con Cuông is a rural district of Nghệ An province in the North Central Coast region of Vietnam. As of 2003 the district had a population of 66,702. The district covers an area of 1,745 km². The district capital lies at Con Cuông.

References

Districts of Nghệ An province